A regional council is a self-governing local authority. There are 21 regional councils (one of which is a municipality having the same responsibilities as a county council), each corresponding to a county. Regional councils are governed by a regional assembly (regionfullmäktige) that is elected by the regional electorate every four years in conjunction with the general elections. The most important responsibilities of regional councils are the public health care system and public transportation. It is one of the  principal administrative subdivisions of Sweden. 

Within the same geographical borders as the regional councils, there are county administrative boards, an administrative entity appointed by the government.  As of 2010, the different regional council assemblies had a combined total of 1,696 seats.

Constitutionally, the regional councils exercise a degree of municipal self-government provided by the Basic Laws of Sweden. This does not constitute any degree of federalism, which is consistent with Sweden's status as a unitary state.

Within the geographic boundaries of the county there are also several smaller municipalities and administrations that exercise local self-government independent of the regional councils. These can also be referred to as "primary municipalities" or primärkommuner, while the larger regional councils are sekundärkommuner, "secondary municipalities". The Municipality of Gotland is an exception, due to its geographical boundaries, as Gotland Municipality also has the responsibilities of a regional council.

Historically, Stockholm was separate from counties and was not under the jurisdiction of the Stockholm County Council until 1967, and some other large cities were in counties but outside regional councils. The cities handled the responsibilities. The two last such cities were Malmö and Göteborg until 1998.

In January 2020, the county councils (landsting) of Sweden were officially reclassified as Regions (regioner). De facto, the regional councils had already adopted the 'Region' title well before the new law was adopted.

See also
:Category:County Councils of Sweden
County administrative boards of Sweden
Regions of Finland

References

External links
Municipalities and regions
Official translation of the Local Government Act *About Stockholm County Council

 
 
Government of Sweden